BBR may refer to:

Arts and entertainment
 Bitches brauchen Rap, an album by German rapper Shirin David
 Black Box Recorder, a British band
 The Black Box Revelation, a Belgian alternative rock band
 Boom Boom Rocket, an Xbox video game

Organisations
 Belize Bird Rescue
 Berry Bros. & Rudd, a London-based wine merchant
 Billionaire Boys Racing, a Thai auto racing team
 Broken Bow Records, a country music label

Technology
 Behavior-based robotics
 TCP BBR, a network congestion control algorithm

Transport
 SBA Airlines (ICAO code BBR, 1995–2018), Venezuelan
 Beitbridge Bulawayo Railway, between Zimbabwe and South Africa
 Barasat Basirhat Railway (1914–1955), near Kolkata, India
 Bennett Brook Railway, in Perth, Western Australia

Other uses
 Bulletin for Biblical Research, a journal
 4.5-Inch Beach Barrage Rocket, a World War II U.S. Navy weapon